Wapakoneta (YTB-766) was a United States Navy  named for the city of Wapakoneta, Ohio.

Construction
The contract for Wapakoneta was awarded 7 December 1961. She was laid down on 1 August 1962 at Slidell, Louisiana, by Southern Shipbuilding Corporation and launched 11 June 1963.

Operational history
In October 1963, Wapakoneta was placed in service in the 5th Naval District at Norfolk, Virginia. She performed unglamorous, but vital, duties in those waters, providing tug and tow services, pilot assistance, and stand-by waterfront fire protection.

After more than 37 years of service at Norfolk Naval Base, Wapakoneta was stricken from the Navy Directory on 16 April 2001 and was sold on 16 July 2001.

References

External links
 

Natick-class large harbor tugs
Ships built in Slidell, Louisiana
1963 ships